Passang Dorji is a Bhutanese politician who has been a member of the National Assembly of Bhutan, since October 2018.

Education
He holds a Bachelor of Arts in Economics from University of Delhi,  India and a master's degree in Management from University of Canberra, Australia.Dorji also holds a PhD in International Relations from City University of Hong Hong Kong.

Professional career 
Dorji started his career as an employment office with Ministry of Labour and Human Resources. He later worked as the chief reporter with Bhutan Times and editor with The Journalist. He subsequently became the first president of the Journalist Association of Bhutan. He was also the founding member and board director of Bhutan Transparency Initiative. He later worked as the consultant for United Nations Development Programme and helped in the Five Year Strategic Plan (2014−2019) of the National Assembly of Bhutan and National Council of Bhutan.

Political career
He was elected to the National Assembly of Bhutan as a candidate of DPT from Bartsham-Shongphu constituency in 2018 Bhutanese National Assembly election. He received 4099 votes and defeated Tenzin Lekphell, a candidate of DNT.

References 

1980s births
Living people
Bhutanese MNAs 2018–2023
Druk Phuensum Tshogpa politicians
Bhutanese journalists
Delhi University alumni
University of Canberra alumni
People from Trashigang District
Druk Phuensum Tshogpa MNAs